Drljača is a village in the Banija region in central Croatia, in the municipality of Sunja, Sisak-Moslavina County. The village name means "harrow".

History
Prior to the Croatian War, the village was part of the SAO Krajina, a self-proclaimed Serbian autonomous region. During the war, it became part of the Republic of Srpska Krajina.

Demographics
According to the 2011 census, the village of Drljača has 277 inhabitants. This represents 51.49% of its pre-war population.

According to the 1991 census, 77.88% of the village population were ethnic Serbs (419/538), 7.99% were ethnic Croats (43/538), 6.87% were Yugoslavs (37/538), while 7.25% were of other ethnic origin (39/538).

NOTE: Data for 1869 include data for the settlement of Četvrtkovac, and 1880 data are included in data for the settlement of Četvrtkovac.

Notable natives and residents

References

Populated places in Sisak-Moslavina County
Serb communities in Croatia